Bedminster Down School is a mixed gender secondary school with academy status, located in the Bishopsworth area of Bristol, England.

History 

The school originally opened in 1955 as a comprehensive school but on 1 June 2012 the school officially became an academy. Although the school initially planned on becoming an academy from September 2011, this was delayed.

In 2010, the head teacher of ten years, Marius Frank left the school to become CEO of ASDAN also based in Bristol. The current head teacher is Deborah Gibbs.

The school was part of The Malago Learning Partnership (MLP). MLP was a collaboration between Bedminster Down school, Cheddar Grove Primary, Greenfield Primary, Headley Park Primary, Parson Street Primary, Victoria Park Primary and St Peters CofE Primary.

Building
In 2003, the school was selected as one of four schools in Bristol to be completely rebuilt through the PFI programme.
Work began on the new school building in 2004, and the new school opened at Easter time 2006.

Academic achievement
The school has improved its results year on year and achieved its best ever GCSE scores in 2016, the table below shows the percentage of students hitting the key measure of 5 A*-C (9 - 4 from 2017 onward) including English and Mathematics over the last 5 years.

Ofsted inspection
The school's latest inspection took place on 6 and 7 November 2014 and it received the following grades:

References

External links
Official website

Secondary schools in Bristol
Academies in Bristol